The 2002 Oceania Youth Athletics Championships were held at the Queen Elizabeth II Park in Christchurch, New Zealand, between December 12–14, 2002. They were held together with the 2002 Oceania Open Championships.
A total of 34 events were contested, 17 by boys and 17 by girls.

Medal summary
Medal winners can be found on the Athletics Weekly webpage. Complete results can be found on the webpages of World Junior Athletics History, and of the Cool Running New Zealand newsgroup.

Boys under 18 (Youth)

Girls under 18 (Youth)

Medal table (unofficial)

Participation (unofficial)
An unofficial count yields the number of about 96 athletes from 15 countries:

 (4)
 (24)
 (8)
 (3)
 (5)
 (6)
 (10)
 (11)
 (2)
 (3)
 (6)
 (4)
/ (4)
 (3)
 (3)

References

Oceania Youth Athletics Championships
International athletics competitions hosted by New Zealand
Oceania Youth Athletics Championships
Oceania Youth Athletics Championships
Oceania Youth Athletics Championships
October 2002 sports events in New Zealand